Croatian Ecuadorians are Ecuadorians who are descended from migrants from Croatia. There are approximately 4,000 Croats and their descendants living in Ecuador. One can mention two major periods of the immigration of Croats to Ecuador; the first one at the end of the 19th century and the early 20th century and the recent that started in the 1990s.  During the first period, Croat immigrants were moistly traders from Dubrovnik, Split and the island of Vis who settled in agricultural parts of Ecuador, especially in the region of Manabí, and in the cities such Bahía de Caráquez, Chone, Manta, Portoviejo and Guayaquil, Cuenca and Quito.
The current immigration of Croats began with their arrival in Ecuador and was largely motivated by the interest in the fish industry and the exploration of marine crustaceans.  Most of these new immigrants come from the Adriatic coast, especially from Split, and are employed in the tuna and sardines processing industry. Ecuadorian Croats and their descendants have a high cultural and economic status in the society and are quite prominent, particularly in the agricultural and fishing fields, as well as in commerce and industry.
Ecuador has a large fleet of ships for banana transportation; also fish and merchant vessels whose crew is also made up of Croats living in Guayaquil. They are, however, not registered as Croatian immigrants.
In 2004 an association was established in Ecuador where Croats and their descendants often congregate. Included are Istro-Romanians, who became adjusted to Ecuadorian society because of the linguistic similarities between Istro-Romanian and Spanish, as well as Latin identity of Istro-Romanians.

Notable people

 Hugo Savinovich - former WWE Ecuadorian announcer and professional wrestler.
 Radmila Pandzic - ex-Miss Ecuador 1995.
 Tomislav Topic - Ecuadorian businessman.
 Édgar Diminich - sailor.

See also
 Croats
 List of people from Croatia

References 

 Croatian Diaspora in Ecuador.
 Croatian-Ecuadorians.

Ecuador
European Ecuadorian